The Palompon Polytechnic State University (PPSU) is a state university in the Philippines.  It is mandated to provide higher vocational, professional, and technical instruction and training in trade and industrial education and other vocational courses, professional courses, and offer engineering courses.  It is also mandated to promote research, advance studies and progressive leadership in the fields of trade, technical, industrial and technological education. Its main campus is in Palompon, Leyte.

The Palompon Institute of Technology is composed of many colleges including the College of Education, College of Technology and Engineering, College of Arts and Science, College of Maritime Education and College of Advance Education. It is located along Evangelista Street in Palompon, Leyte Province, Philippines. It is a Leyte educational institution that specializes in the field of maritime sciences, and offers academic programs such as Bachelor of Science in marine transportation, Bachelor of Science in marine engineering, Bachelor of Science in electrical engineering, Bachelor of Science in mechanical engineering, Bachelor of Science in industrial engineering, Bachelor of Science in industrial technology, Bachelor of Science in information technology, Bachelor of Arts in communication, Bachelor of Science in shipping management, Bachelor of Science in hotel and restaurant management, Major in cruise ship, Bachelor of Elementary Education, Bachelor of Secondary Education, and Bachelor of Science in home technology education. Aside from these baccalaureate degrees, the college offers graduate academic programs that include Doctor of Philosophy Major in educational management, Master of Arts Major in community development, and Master of Technology Education. Furthermore, this educational institution also offers scholarships and grants to numerous intelligent students.

References

State universities and colleges in the Philippines
Universities and colleges in Leyte (province)